West Kensington is a London Underground District line station in West Kensington. It is located on North End Road (B317) close to its junction with West Cromwell Road/Talgarth Road (A4).

The station is between Earl's Court and Barons Court and is in Travelcard Zone 2.

The station is situated in a cutting with the ticket office at street level.

History
The station was opened by the District Railway (DR, now the District line) on 9 September 1874 as 'North End (Fulham)' when it opened its extension from Earl's Court to Hammersmith. At that time the next station west was Hammersmith - Barons Court did not open until 1905.
It was renamed West Kensington in 1877. Despite its name, the station is located in Hammersmith and Fulham.

On 5 May 1878, The Midland Railway began running a circuitous service known as the "Super Outer Circle" from St Pancras to Earl's Court via Cricklewood and South Acton. It operated over a now disused connection between the NLR and the London and South Western Railway's branch to Richmond (now part of the District line). The service was not a success and was ended on 30 September 1880.

The entrance building was rebuilt in 1927. The design, by Charles Holden, uses similar materials and finishes to those Holden used for the Northern line's Morden extension opened in 1926.

In 2009, because of financial constraints, TfL decided to stop work on a project to provide step-free access at West Kensington and five other stations, on the grounds that these are relatively quiet stations and some are already one or two stops away from an existing step-free station. Earl's Court and Hammersmith stations which have step-free access are respectively one stop to the east and two stops to the west. £5.05 million was spent on West Kensington before the project was halted.

Services
The off-peak service pattern is:
6 trains per hour to Ealing Broadway
6 tph to Richmond
12 tph to Upminster.

Connections
London Buses Routes 28, 306 and Night Route N28 serve the station.

References

External links

 London Transport Museum Photographic Archive
 
 
  The branch track to Lillie Bridge depot is just visible at the end of the platform.
 Tube Professional's Rumour Network - Lillie Bridge depot

District line stations
Tube stations in the London Borough of Hammersmith and Fulham
Former Metropolitan District Railway stations
Railway stations in Great Britain opened in 1874
Charles Holden railway stations
Tube station
Fulham